Olfa Lafi (born 16 September 1986) is a Tunisian race walker.

Career 

She first competed at the 2005 African Junior Athletics Championships held in Tunis and Radès, Tunisia where she won the bronze medal in the women's 10 kilometres walk event.

In 2009 she competed in the African Race Walking Championships where she won the silver medal in the women's 20 kilometres walk.

In 2011 she won the silver medal in the women's 20 kilometres walk event at the 2011 All-Africa Games in Maputo, Mozambique.

She won a medal at the Arab Athletics Championships in the women's 10 kilometres walk on several occasions: she won the gold medal in 2013 and the silver medal both in 2009 and in 2015.

Achievements

References

External links 
 

Living people
1986 births
Place of birth missing (living people)
Tunisian female racewalkers
Mediterranean Games competitors for Tunisia
Athletes (track and field) at the 2013 Mediterranean Games
Athletes (track and field) at the 2011 All-Africa Games
African Games medalists in athletics (track and field)
African Games silver medalists for Tunisia
20th-century Tunisian women
21st-century Tunisian women